Dracophyllum pronum, commonly known as Trailing neinei, is a species of sprawling shrub endemic to New Zealand. It was first described by Walter Oliver in 1928 and gets the specific epithet pronum for its prostrate growth habit. In the heath family Ericaceae, it inhabits montane and subalpine areas and reaches a height of just 1–25 cm.

References 

pronum
Endemic flora of New Zealand
Taxa named by Walter Oliver